The Scion Fuse is a concept car created under one of Toyota's brands, Scion. The Fuse was built by Five Axis Models in Huntington Beach, CA with assistance from MillenWorks. It was first introduced at the 2006 New York International Auto Show. According to Scion, the Fuse is a 2-door coupe with 4 seats and scissor doors.

The Fuse uses a DOHC gasoline I4 engine equipped with multi-port fuel-injection and VVT-i.

The Fuse includes features such as steer by wire, a retractable spoiler, a power operated hatch that slides upwards along with a flip out bench for tailgating, a beverage cooler, a built in Wi-Fi connection, LED lighting in multiple places including the seat piping and wheels, programmable multi color headlights, a passenger seat that folds into a footrest or table, and more.

The 2011 Scion tC took inspiration from the Fuse.

External links
Official press release from Toyota
Scion FUSE Concept at autoblog.com

References

Fuse
Concept cars
Cars introduced in 2006
Front-wheel-drive sports cars
Sport compact cars
Coupés